Henry Peterson (December 7, 1818 –  October 10, 1891) was an American editor, novelist, poet, and playwright. He was also an abolitionist. For twenty years, Peterson edited The Saturday Evening Post. He was born in Philadelphia, Pennsylvania, to son of George and Jane (Evans) Peterson. His eldest brother was the publisher Robert Evans Peterson, and his cousin was the publisher Charles J. Peterson. He was a clerk in a hardware store at fourteen, and in 1839 a member of the firm of Deacon & Peterson, who became publishers of the Saturday Evening Post, with Peterson as sole editor. He was married to Sarah Webb, who edited The Lady's Friend magazine for ten years, and their son, Arthur Peterson, became assistant editor of the Post. His works include The Twin Brothers (1843); Universal Suffrage (1867); The Modern Job (1869); Pemberton, or One Hundred Years Ago (1873); Faire-Mount (1874); Confessions of a Minister (1874); Caesar, a Dramatic Study (1879); Poems (1863), and the drama Helen, or One hundred Years Ago, produced in 1876. He died in Philadelphia in 1891.  He is interred at Laurel Hill Cemetery in Philadelphia.

References

External links

1818 births
1891 deaths
19th-century American novelists
19th-century American poets
Burials at Laurel Hill Cemetery (Philadelphia)
Writers from Philadelphia
American magazine editors